Diana Mórová (born 18 February 1970) is a Slovak film and stage actress. Among other, she is the holder of two OTO Awards.

Tanec snov
In 2015 she was part of dancing competition Tanec snov where she was paired with dancer Andrej Krížik.

Awards

References
General

Specific

External links 

 Diana Mórová at SND
 Diana Mórová at ČSFd
 
 Diana Mórová at KinoBox
 Diana Mórová at SFd

1970 births
Living people
Actors from Bratislava
Slovak stage actresses
Slovak film actresses
Slovak television actresses
21st-century Slovak actresses